Bruce H. Osborne (August 27, 1924 – November 23, 2008) was an American football player and coach. He was the first head football coach at Southern Utah University, serving from 1963 to 1964 and compiling a record of 8–5–1. Osborne played college football at Utah State University and Brigham Young University (BYU).

Osborne was a member of the Church of Jesus Christ of Latter-day Saints. He served in the United States Marine Corps in World War II in the South Pacific.

Head coaching record

College

References

1924 births
2008 deaths
BYU Cougars football players
Southern Utah Thunderbirds football coaches
Utah State Aggies football players
High school football coaches in Utah
People from Beaver, Utah
Players of American football from Utah
Latter Day Saints from Utah
United States Marine Corps personnel of World War II